Orange is a city located in northern Orange County, California. Orange is unusual in this region because many of the homes in its Old Town District were built before 1920. While many other cities in the region demolished such houses in the 1960s, Orange decided to preserve them. The small city of Villa Park is surrounded by the city of Orange. The population of Orange was 139,911 as of 2020.

History

Members of the Tongva and Juaneño/Luiseño ethnic group long inhabited this area. After the 1769 expedition of Gaspar de Portolá, an expedition out of San Blas, Nayarit, Mexico, led by Father Junípero Serra, named the area Vallejo de Santa Ana (Valley of Saint Anne). On November 1, 1776, Mission San Juan Capistrano became the area's first permanent European settlement in Alta California, New Spain.

In 1801, the Spanish Empire granted  to José Antonio Yorba, which he named Rancho San Antonio. Yorba's great rancho included the lands where the cities of Olive, Orange, El Modena, Villa Park, Santa Ana, Tustin, Costa Mesa and Newport Beach stand today. Smaller ranchos evolved from this large rancho, including the Rancho Santiago de Santa Ana.

Don Juan Pablo Grijalva, a retired known Spanish soldier and the area's first landowner, was granted permission in 1809 by the Spanish colonial government to establish a rancho in "the place of the Arroyo de Santiago".

After the Mexican–American War, Alta California was ceded to the United States by Mexico with the signing of the Treaty of Guadalupe Hidalgo in 1848, and though many Californios lost titles to their lands in the aftermath, Grijalva's descendants retained ownership through marriages to Anglo-Americans.

Since at least 1864, Los Angeles attorneys Alfred Chapman and Andrew Glassell, together and separately, held about  along both sides of the Santiago Creek (Glassell also had a  parcel where Costa Mesa is today). Water was the key factor for the location of their townsite (bordered by Almond Avenue on the south, Lemon Street on the west, Glassell Street on the east, & Maple Avenue on the north). Glassell needed a spot he could irrigate, bringing water down from the Santa Ana Canyon and the quality of the soil may have influenced his choice. Originally, the community was named Richland, but in 1873 Richland got a new name.
In the book, Orange, The City 'Round The Plaza by local historian Phil Brigandi, it states, "In 1873 the town had grown large enough to require a post office, so an application was sent to Washington. It was refused, however, as there was (and is) already a Richland, California in Sacramento County. Undaunted, the Richlanders proposed a new name – Orange."

The small town was incorporated on April 6, 1888, under the general laws of the state of California. Orange was the only city in Orange County to be planned and built around a plaza, earning it the nickname Plaza City. Orange was the first developed town site to be served by the California Southern Railroad when the nation's second transcontinental rail line reached Orange County.

The town experienced its first growth spurt during the last decade of the 19th century (as did many of the surrounding communities), thanks to ever-increasing demands for California-grown citrus fruits, a period some refer to as the "Orange Era". Southern California's real estate "boom" of 1886–1888, fueled by railroad rate wars, also contributed to a marked increase in population. Like most cities in Orange County, agriculture formed the backbone of the local economy, and growth thereafter was slow and steady until the 1950s, when a second real estate boom spurred development. Inspired by the development of a region-wide freeway system which connected Los Angeles' urban center with outlying areas like Orange, large tracts of housing were developed from the 1950s to the early 1970s, and continues today, albeit at a much slower pace, at the eastern edge of the city.

During the COVID-19 Pandemic, the City of Orange approved the closure of North and South Glassell Street to open the Orange Plaza Paseo, where businesses located on each street could open socially distant outdoor seating and patios. On December 8, 2020, the city council voted unanimously to continue to keep the street closed until state or local restrictions end, or by council direction.

Geography
The total area is 1.75% water.

Climate
Southern California is well known for year-round pleasant weather: 
 On average, the warmest month is August.
 On average, the coolest month is December.
 The maximum average precipitation occurs in January.

The period of November through March is somewhat rainy, as shown in the table to right.

The Orange County area is also subject to the phenomena typical of a microclimate. California also has a weather phenomenon called "June Gloom" or "May Gray", which sometimes brings overcast or foggy skies in the morning on the coast, but usually gives way to sunny skies by noon, during late spring and early summer.
The Orange County area averages  of precipitation annually, which mainly occurs during the winter and spring (November thru April) with generally light rain showers, but sometimes as heavy rainfall and thunderstorms. Coastal Torrance receives slightly less rainfall, while the mountains receive slightly more. Snowfall is extremely rare in the city basin, but the mountains in the surrounding areas receive snowfall every winter.

Cityscape
Old Towne, Orange Historic District, a one square-mile around the original plaza, contains many of the original structures built in the period after the city's incorporation. It is a vibrant commercial district, containing Orange County's oldest operating bank and the oldest operating soda fountain. The Historic District was listed on the National Register of Historic Places in 1997, and is the largest National Register District in California. The Old Towne Preservation Association is a non-profit organization dedicated to maintaining the district.

Orange is unique among the region and the state in that it has the second largest concentration of historic buildings. A list of all of the buildings and sites in Orange appears in the National Register of Historic Places. The Civic Center was designed by Welton Becket in 1963.

Though Orange is now a fully developed city, there are still several unincorporated portions of land within the city that have not yet been annexed, including El Modena and North El Modena, Orange Park Acres, and Olive.

Demographics

2010
The 2010 United States Census reported that Orange had a population of 136,416. The racial makeup of Orange was 91,522 (67.1%) White (46.8% Non-Hispanic White), 2,227 (1.6%) African American, 993 (0.7%) Native American, 15,350 (11.3%) Asian, 352 (0.3%) Pacific Islander, 20,567 (15.1%) from other races, and 5,405 (4.0%) from two or more races. There were 52,014 Hispanic or Latino residents, of any race  (38.1%).

The Census reported that 130,163 people (95.4% of the population) lived in households, 2,587 (1.9%) lived in non-institutionalized group quarters, and 3,666 (2.7%) were institutionalized.

There were 43,367 households, out of which 16,303 (37.6%) had children under the age of 18 living in them, 23,572 (54.4%) were opposite-sex married couples living together, 5,260 (12.1%) had a female householder with no husband present, 2,424 (5.6%) had a male householder with no wife present.  There were 2,442 (5.6%) unmarried opposite-sex partnerships, and 373 (0.9%) same-sex married couples or partnerships. 8,480 households (19.6%) were made up of individuals, and 3,115 (7.2%) had someone living alone who was 65 years of age or older. The average household size was 3.00.  There were 31,256 families (72.1% of all households); the average family size was 3.42.

In Orange, there were 32,096 people (23.5%) under the age of 18, 16,420 people (12.0%) aged 18 to 24, 39,574 people (29.0%) aged 25 to 44, 33,698 people (24.7%) aged 45 to 64, and 14,628 people (10.7%) who were 65 years of age or older.  The median age was 34.8 years. For every 100 females, there were 101.5 males.  For every 100 females age 18 and over, there were 99.7 males.

The homeowner vacancy rate was 1.1%; the rental vacancy rate was 5.1%.  77,179 people (56.6% of the population) lived in owner-occupied housing units and 52,984 people (38.8%) lived in rental housing units.

During 20092013, Orange had a median household income of $78,838, with 11.8% of the population living below the federal poverty line.

2000
As of the census of 2000, there were 128,821 people, 40,930 households, and 30,165 families residing in the city. The population density was 5,506.4 inhabitants per square mile (2,126.5/km).

The racial makeup of the city was 70.60% White, 1.59% African American, 0.78% Native American, 9.22% Asian, 0.23% Pacific Islander, 13.84% from other races, and 3.74% from two or more races. 32.21% of the population were Hispanic or Latino of any race.

There were 40,930 households, out of which 37.1% had children under the age of 18 living with them, 57.1% were married couples living together, 11.6% had a female householder with no husband present, and 26.3% were non-families. 19.5% of all households were made up of individuals, and 6.6% had someone living alone who was 65 years of age or older. The average household size was 3.02 and the average family size was 3.43.

The population was spread out, with 26.7% under the age of 18, 9.9% from 18 to 24, 33.3% from 25 to 44, 20.5% from 45 to 64, and 9.6% who were 65 years of age or older. The median age was 33 years. For every 100 females, there were 100.8 males.  For every 100 females age 18 and over, there were 98.7 males.

The median income for a household in the city was $58,994, and the median income for a family was $64,573 (these figures had risen to $75,024 and $85,730 respectively as of a 2007 estimate). Males had a median income of $42,144 versus $34,159 for females. The per capita income for the city was $24,294. 10.0% of the population and 6.8% of families were below the poverty line. Out of the total population, 12.5% of those under the age of 18 and 7.5% of those 65 and older were living below the poverty line.

Crime
From data, Orange is safer than 35% of U.S. cities, and Orange's violent crime rate is lower than the national average of 4 violent crimes per 1,000 residents at about 1 per 1,000 residents. Property crime rate is higher, at almost 16 property crimes per 1,000 residents, still lower than the national and state averages by at least 6. There were 94 crimes per square mile in Orange, higher than the state average of 83, and at least 70 crimes higher than the national average of about 28.

Statistically, year after year crime has continually decreased by 10%.

On March 31, 2021, four people were killed and two more were injured in a mass shooting at an office complex along Lincoln Avenue in north Orange.

Economy

Largest employers
According to the city's 2021 Comprehensive Annual Financial Report, the top employers in the city are:

Arts and culture

Points of interest
The Orange International Street Fair has occurred annually over Labor Day Weekend in Downtown Orange since 1973. The fair draws an average of 400,000 in attendance every year.

The Orange County Zoo is located in Orange at Irvine Regional Park.

Shopping includes The Village at Orange and The Outlets at Orange, an outdoor shopping and entertainment center that includes a skatepark and bowling center.

The Woman's Club of Orange, organized in 1915, holds an annual flower show. Their clubhouse, built in 1923–1924, is listed on the National Register of Historic Places.

The "Villa Park Orchards Association" packing house, located along the former Atchison, Topeka and Santa Fe Railway mainline, is the sole remaining fruit packing operation in Orange County.

The Lewis Ainsworth House is a restored house museum.

Architectural styles in Old Towne Orange
Architectural styles in Old Towne Orange include Bungalow, Craftsman Bungalow, Arts and Crafts Movement, Hip roof cottage, Mediterranean Revival architecture, Prairie Style architecture, Spanish Colonial Revival architecture, and Victorian architecture.

Sports

In 1978 and 1979, the California Sunshine was a professional soccer team that played regular season games in Orange.

The city roots for major league teams: the Los Angeles Angels of Anaheim of baseball and the Anaheim Ducks of ice hockey, right along the city borders across the Santa Ana River in Anaheim.

In the city proper: the SoCal A's of the Southern California Collegiate Baseball Association play in Athletic (or Richland) Field.

Government

Orange, like much of Orange County, is known for its affluence and political conservatism – a 2005 academic study listed Orange among three Orange County cities as being among America's 25 "most conservative", making it one of two counties in the country containing more than one such city (Maricopa County, Arizona also has three cities on the list).

Orange remains a somewhat conservative city in recent years; however, in 2016, Hillary Clinton defeated Donald Trump by 1,463 votes (2.7%). Nevertheless, the city voted 3% more Republican than the average of Orange County, and nearly 14% more Republican than the state of California as a whole. In 2020, Joe Biden carried the city by a larger margin, winning 52.5% of the vote to Donald Trump's 45.2%, though this was still much narrower than his statewide margin.

According to the California Secretary of State, as of February 10, 2019, Orange had 69,828 registered voters. Of those, 25,744 (36.87%) were registered Republicans, 22,162 (31.74%) are registered Democrats, and 18,759 (26.86%) were independents.

Education
All public schools (excluding Santiago Canyon College) in the region are managed by the Orange Unified School District, which serves approximately 28,000 students across the cities of Orange, Anaheim, Garden Grove, Santa Ana, Villa Park, and some unincorporated parts of Orange County. High schools include Orange High School, Villa Park High School, El Modena High School, and Canyon High School.

Universities and colleges 
Chapman University 
Santiago Canyon College

Other schools 
International School of Los Angeles
Eldorado Emerson Private School  — preschool and K-12
Lutheran High School of Orange County

Infrastructure

Transportation

Automobile
Orange is situated near Interstate 5, also known as the Santa Ana Freeway. The junction of I-5 with two state highways (SR 57, the "Orange Freeway" and SR 22, the "Garden Grove Freeway"), commonly called the "Orange Crush", is one of the busiest interchanges in Orange County, and is located on the southwestern edge of the city. The Costa Mesa Freeway (SR 55) also passes through Orange, meeting the eastern terminus of SR 22 in the southern part of the city. The eastern areas of Orange are served by the Eastern and Foothill Toll Roads (SR 261 and SR 241), two of California's first toll highways, which connect the city with the cities of Irvine and Rancho Santa Margarita.

Rail

One year later, the Santa Ana and Orange Motor Road Company purchased the line, using a steam "dummy" car and a single gasoline motorcar as its means of conveyance. In 1906, Henry E. Huntington acquired the company under the auspices of the Los Angeles Inter-Urban Railway and electrified the line.

Passenger service over the new line operated by Huntington's Pacific Electric Railway began on June 8, 1914, originating at the PE's depot on Lemon Street. The route provided freight service to the local citrus growers, in direct competition with the Atchison, Topeka and Santa Fe Railway. Pacific Electric sold out in 1961 to the Southern Pacific Railroad, who ultimately abandoned the line in 1964.

The Santa Fe, under its affiliate the Southern California Railway, laid its first tracks through Orange in 1886, and established its first depot the following year. The route would become part of the railroad's famous "Surf Line", and by 1925, 16 daily passenger trains (the Santa Fe's San Diegan) made stops in Orange. During peak growing seasons, as many as 48 carloads of citrus fruits, olives, and walnuts were shipped daily from the Orange depot as well.

Orange's former Santa Fe depot, in Mediterranean Revival style, still stands adjacent to the current Orange Station, which uses the platform area. It was dedicated on May 1, 1938, and was closed with the discontinuation of passenger service in 1971, though commuter service resumed at the adjacent platform in 1993. The building was granted historic landmark status by the city on November 15, 1990. In July 2004, the facility was home to a Cask 'n Cleaver restaurant and was remodeled and reopened in 2011 as a Ruby's Diner.

Rail connections to Los Angeles, the Inland Empire, and Northern San Diego County are provided by the Metrolink regional commuter rail network. The Orange Metrolink station's platform is situated adjacent to the former Santa Fe depot in the downtown Historic District, which is also home to an Orange County Transportation Authority (OCTA) bus station, is the second busiest station of the entire Metrolink train system due to its position serving as a transfer station for the Orange County and the IEOC Metrolink lines. The former Santa Fe mainline links the cities of Los Angeles, Riverside, and San Diego via a junction north of the station.

Airports
John Wayne Airport (SNA), in nearby Santa Ana, provides daily scheduled airline service for the area.

Emergency services
OPD polices through three divisions; the Field Services Division, which consists of Patrol, Traffic Bureau, Communications Center, Crime Analysis, Bike Unit and H.E.A.R.T (Homeless Education and Resource Team); the Investigative Services Division, which consists of Crimes Against Person, Property and Economic Crimes, Gang Unit and the Special Investigations Unit; and finally the Support Services Division, which consists of Fiscal Affairs, Information Technology, Timekeeping, Personnel and Training, Crime Prevention/Analysis Unit, Volunteer Program, CERT, Facility and Fleet Services. The department also operates a SWAT team.

Fire protection is provided by the Orange City Fire Department which has eight stations across the city, which house seven fire engines, one fire truck, one quintuple combination pumper, and four rescue ambulances. The Department is a member of the Metro Cities Fire Authority which provides emergency communications for multiple departments in and around Orange County. The Department employs three battalion chiefs, which each manage a team of three shifts of 35 firefighters, each cross trained as an emergency medical technician.

Notable people
Don Aase, born in Orange, MLB player
Héctor Ambriz, MLB player for the Houston Astros and the Cleveland Indians
Garrett Atkins, MLB player for the Baltimore Orioles and Colorado Rockies.
 Shane Bieber, MLB player who plays for the Cleveland Indians
Erica Blasberg (1984–2010), LPGA golfer, born in Orange
Bert Blyleven, MLB player who played in the California Angels and once owned a cafe in nearby Villa Park.
Jeff Buckley (1966–1997), singer-songwriter and guitarist
Lauren Chamberlain, softball infielder, born in Orange
Bud Daley, MLB player for the Cleveland Indians, Kansas City Athletics, and New York Yankees
Mikey Day, comedian, writer and cast member on Saturday Night Live, born in Orange
Deakin, member of Animal Collective, born in Orange.
Rob Deer, MLB player for the San Francisco Giants, Milwaukee Brewers, Detroit Tigers, Boston Red Sox, and San Diego Padres.
Zach Ertz, tight end for the Philadelphia Eagles, born in Orange
Placida Gardner Chesley, WWI worker, bacteriologist
Charles Gipson, former MLB player for the Baltimore Orioles, New York Yankees, Tampa Bay Devil Rays and Houston Astros
Ciara Hanna, born in Orange, martial art actress
Casey Janssen, MLB player, born in Orange.
Chris Jent, NBA assistant coach for the Los Angeles Lakers
Steve Johnson, professional tennis player, two-time NCAA champion
 Dean Koontz, novelist, once resided in Orange Hills and set many of his novels, such as The Bad Place, in the area.
 Rusty Kuntz, baseball World Series champion player (1984) and coach (2015).
Justin Lehr, MLB player for the Cincinnati Reds, Oakland Athletics, and Milwaukee Brewers, born in Orange.
Alexander Lévy (born 1990), professional golfer
Hunter Mahan, PGA Tour golfer, born in Orange.
Scott McAdams, former mayor of Sitka, Alaska and Democratic nominee for U.S. Senate in Alaska in 2010, born in Orange
Mike Pompeo (born 1963), US Secretary of State and past CIA Director
 Sunny (birth name: Susan Soonkyu Lee), a Korean-American singer and entertainer, based in South Korea, who is a member of K-pop girl group Girls' Generation.
Ginger Zee, meteorologist, ABC News and Good Morning America, born in Orange.

Sister cities

 Novo Kosino, Moscow, Russia
 Orange, New South Wales, Australia
 Orange, Vaucluse, France
 Santiago de Querétaro, Mexico
 Timaru, New Zealand

Orange used to have two community partnerships with Utrecht, the Netherlands; and Santiago, Chile.

See also
 List of museums in Orange County, California
 List of Tree Cities USA

References

External links

 
 City Data

 
Orange
Orange
Orange
Populated places established in 1869
Orange